Beatrice Munyenyezi (born 1970) is a Rwandan woman known for her alleged involvement in the Rwandan Genocide. She sought political asylum in the United States where she successfully applied citing persecution in her home country. Almost two decades later, in 2013, a US court prosecuted Beatrice for lying about her political affiliation during the Rwandan Genocide. She was stripped of her American citizenship and was given a ten-year sentence.

Life
Munyenyezi was born around 1970 in Butare, Southern Province, in Rwanda.

When she married, her husband's mother was Pauline Nyiramasuhuko who was later a minister in the provisional government of Juvénal Habyarimana. The event that triggered the start of the Tutsi genocide was the assassination of the Rwandan president when his plane was shot down on 6 April 1994. Her mother and husband were involved in activities in Munyenyezi's home town. Her husband was a student at the National University of Rwanda in Butare. He was also a leader in the extremist Hutu organisation known as the Interahamwe for the area around the city.

Her husband and others were found guilty of killing refugees, orphans and patients from the local hospital and of taking Tutsi prisoners and arranging for them to be executed. In particular he and his mother organised and staffed a roadblock outside their family's hotel where Tutsi were identified, imprisoned and executed.

In 1997 her husband and his mother were arrested in Nairobi where he had been running a grocery store for three years.

In 1998 she and her three daughters settled in Manchester, New Hampshire after she was given political asylum based on her testimony that she was being persecuted in her home country.

Munyenyezi had lied as a defence witness for her husband and mother-in-law who had been tried by an international tribunal for their part in the genocide in 2006. They had both been sentenced to life imprisonment despite Munyenyezi's evidence that they were not involved in the genocide. She said that she had not seen any killings at the infamous roadblock near their house. Other witnesses gave contradictory evidence and these were supported by satellite images. The US court decided that Munyenyezi was involved at the roadblock. She had inspected identity cards to decide people's racial background. When she said that someone was Tutsi then she had in effect condemned them to death. People were murdered and raped at that roadblock.

In 2013 she lost her US citizenship based on her early perjury at her hearing for her political asylum a decade before. Her defence attorney argued that she had not committed a crime in America and she had been pregnant and uninvolved. He argued that the court case was costing millions of dollars. She was given a ten-year sentence. She and her attorney appealed against the sentence but the judges said that the evidence did not come "within a country mile" of arguing for a mistrial.

In October 2019 an American judge turned down her request for a retrial noting that the reasons for a retrial were trivial. The judge said that the sentence would stand and she faced the prospect of being deported when her sentence was complete.

2021 arrest 
On 17 April 2021, Munyenyezi was arrested upon her arrival to Rwanda after deportation from the U.S. on charges of murder and complicity in rape related to the Rwandan Genocide. She did not comment to local press but denied the accusations while in the United States. On 5 May 2021, she was indicted before a court in Kigali, Rwanda, where she denied the charges against her saying that during the 1994 genocide, she was a pregnant teenager and that could have had nothing to do with the crimes of which she stands accused. She was ordered to remain in custody and was escorted out of the courtroom in handcuffs.

2022
In September 2022 she appeared in Rwanda's Intermediate Court of Huye charged with offences relating to genocide and rape.

References

1970 births
Living people
Rwandan genocide perpetrators
Rwandan emigrants to the United States
Rwandan people imprisoned abroad
People from Butare
Denaturalized citizens of the United States
Prisoners and detainees of Rwanda
People deported from the United States
Prisoners and detainees of the United States federal government
People convicted of immigration fraud for concealing war crimes